The 1981 Ole Miss Rebels football team represented the University of Mississippi as a member of the Southeastern Conference (SEC) during the 1981 NCAA Division I-A football season. Le by fourth-year head coach Steve Sloan, the Rebels compiled an overall record of 4–6–1 with a mark of 1–5–1 in conference play, placing ninth in the SEC  The season opened with a close win over Tulane.

Schedule

Roster

Game summaries

Mississippi State
John Fourcade plunged from one yard out with two seconds left for the winning score in his final game.

References

Ole Miss
Ole Miss Rebels football seasons
Ole Miss Rebels football